Nomia tetrazonata is a species of sweat bee in the family Halictidae. It is found in Central America and North America.

Subspecies
There are two subspecies:
 Nomia tetrazonata tetrazonata Cockerell, 1910
 Nomia tetrazonata uvaldensis Cockerell, 1930

References

tetrazonata
Hymenoptera of North America
Insects described in 1910